Wagner Reloaded-Live in Leipzig is the first live album and eleventh album overall by the Finnish cello metal band Apocalyptica. It was released on 15 November 2013 in Finland and 18 November 2013 elsewhere. It was released three years after their previous studio album 7th Symphony. The time period allowed the band to prepare for a special live event to celebrate the anniversary of Richard Wagner's 200th Birthday. On 5–6 July 2013 the Leipzig Arena witnessed the sold-out première of Wagner Reloaded. This was a joint venture between German choreographer Gregor Seyffert and Apocalyptica. The event witnessed a blend of dance performances, circus and theatre arts, audiovisual effects, and live music.

To remember this event a state-of-the-art Live CD of Wagner Reloaded was released featuring Apocalyptica and the MDR Symphony Orchestra. The music is influenced by the overall work of Wagner, but is written by  Apocalyptica's Eicca Toppinen. It therefore represents an album of new Apocalyptica material. Unlike recent Apocalyptica albums the album is entirely instrumental.

Reception 

The album received generally favorable reviews.

Track listing
All tracks written by Eicca Toppinen except where noted.

Release

Wagner Reloaded was originally released in three different formats.

Standard CD
Contains the standard 14-track album.

Vinyl LP
Contains the standard 14-track album on double gate-fold album.

Digital Album
Contains the standard 14-track album and video of "Stormy Wagner".

Credits

Apocalyptica
Eicca Toppinen – cello, composer, producer 
Perttu Kivilaakso – cello
Paavo Lötjönen – cello
Mikko Sirén – drums, percussion

Other personnel
MDR Symphony Orchestra 
Sven Helbig – composer, orchestral arrangements
Alex Silva – producer, engineer
Klaus Mücke – engineer
Markku Ollikainen – recording assistant
David Hefti – Pro-Tools
Tim Tautorat – editing
Michael Ilbert – mixing
Svante Forsbäck – mastering

References

External links 
 Official Apocalyptica website
 Apocalyptica Discuss New Live Release Wagner Reloaded, Antimusic.com, 22 November 2013

Apocalyptica albums
2013 live albums
BMG Rights Management albums